West Nova is a federal electoral district in Nova Scotia, Canada, that has been represented in the House of Commons of Canada since 1968.

South Western Nova and South West Nova were ridings that covered roughly the same geographic area and were represented in the House of Commons from 1968 to 1979 and 1979 to 1997, respectively.

The district is rural with a few small towns and communities located along the coast. The riding has been called a microcosm of rural Canada because it includes fishing, farming, tourism, small business and an English-French mix. In 2002, the riding was noted as having the highest Baptist proportion in Canada at 28%.

History
The electoral district was created in 1966 from Digby—Annapolis—Kings and Shelburne—Yarmouth—Clare ridings. In 1996, Seal Island was added and the name was changed from South West Nova to West Nova. In 2004, 20 percent of Kings—Hants was added to the district. The boundaries remained unchanged as per the 2012 federal electoral redistribution. From 1968 until 2004, the Riding was notable for never having elected a single person to a second consecutive term until Robert Thibault won in 2004.

Demographics

From the 2006 census 

Ethnic groups:
White: 97.9%
Black: 1.5%
Other: 0.6%

Languages:
English: 83.0%
French: 15.1%
German: 0.8%
Other: 1.1%

Religions:
Protestant: 48.4%
Catholic: 35.1%
Other Christian: 1.2%
No religious affiliation: 14.5%

Education:
No certificate, diploma or degree: 35.4%
High school certificate: 20.5%
Apprenticeship or trade certificate or diploma: 13.6%
Community college, CEGEP or other non-university certificate or diploma: 18.4%
University certificate or diploma: 12.1%

Income:
Per capita income: $19,450
Median household income: $40,290
Median family income: $48,969
Average house value: $133,217

Median Age:
43.6

Unemployment:
11.3%

From the Canada 2016 Census

 Most common mother tongue languages:  84.8% English, 13.6% French, 0.5% German, 0.2% Dutch, 0.1% Arabic, 0.1% Spanish, 0.1% Polish, 0.1% Cantonese, 0.1% Korean, 0.1% Tagalog.

Geography

It reaches from Berwick in Kings County (it only includes the western part of Kings County) down through Annapolis County, Digby County and Yarmouth County, ending at the Yarmouth-Shelburne border.

Members of Parliament

This riding has elected the following Members of Parliament:

Election results

West Nova

2021 general election

2019 general election

2015 general election

2011 general election

2008 general election

2006 general election

2004 general election

2000 general election

1997 general election

South West Nova

1993 general election

1988 general election

1984 general election

1980 general election

1979 general election

South Western Nova

1974 general election

1972 general election

1968 general election

See also
 List of Canadian federal electoral districts
 Past Canadian electoral districts

References

Sources

 Riding history for South West Nova (1976–1996) from the Library of Parliament
 Riding history for West Nova (1996–1998) from the Library of Parliament
 Riding history for West Nova (1998–2003) from the Library of Parliament
 Riding history for West Nova (2003– ) from the Library of Parliament
 results

Nova Scotia federal electoral districts
Digby County, Nova Scotia
Kings County, Nova Scotia
Middleton, Nova Scotia
Yarmouth, Nova Scotia